Netaji Subhash Ashram Mahavidyalaya, established in 1985, is the general degree college in Suisa, Purulia district. It offers undergraduate courses in arts. It is affiliated to Sidho Kanho Birsha University.

Departments

Arts
Bengali
English
Hindi
History
Geography
Political Science
Philosophy

Accreditation
The college is recognized by the University Grants Commission (UGC).

See also

References

External links
Netaji Subhash Ashram Mahavidyalaya
Sidho Kanho Birsha University
University Grants Commission
National Assessment and Accreditation Council

Colleges affiliated to Sidho Kanho Birsha University
Educational institutions established in 1985
Academic institutions formerly affiliated with the University of Burdwan
Universities and colleges in Purulia district
1985 establishments in West Bengal